State of Deception is the fifth full-length album by the Norwegian power metal/progressive metal band, Conception. It is the band's first album in two decades with new material, and was released on 3 April 2020.

A music video for "No Rewind" was released on 22 May 2021. On 6 June 2021, Conception announced that they would be releasing an expanded edition of the album in 2022, featuring live tracks, re-recordings and new songs. The deluxe version of the album features the single, "Monument in Time" which was released on 5 February 2022.

Critical reception
Alan Cox, a reporter from Sonic Perspectives rated the album 8.1 out of 10, and stated: "State of Deception is not a perfect record. For one, it’s too short. And it could benefit from a couple more killer tracks. But both Khan and Østby provide their really unique 'voices' to deliver something that stands out for flares of uniqueness. It’s a record that requires multiple listens in headphones to fully appreciate for both the songwriting and production, and while it leaves the listener with a whetted appetite more than a fully satisfied stomach, there’s certainly enough to make those who missed Khan and Østby smile. And eagerly wonder what might be coming next."

Track listing

Notes
 The Japanese release of the album features two discs, with the second disc including the band's EP, My Dark Symphony.

Personnel
All information from the album booklet.

Band members
 Roy Khan – vocals
 Tore Østby – guitars, keyboards, bass guitar on "Feather Moves"
 Ingar Amlien – bass on tracks 1–8
 Arve Heimdal – drums

Guests
 Elize Ryd – guest vocals on "The Mansion"
 Miro – keyboards on "in: Deception", "No Rewind", "The Mansion" and "Anybody Out There"
 Lars Andre Kvistum – keyboards, piano on "Waywardly Broken" and "The Mansion"
 Lars Christian Narum – organ, mellotron on "Of Raven and Pigs", "By the Blues", "Anybody Out There" and "She Dragoon"
 Aurora Amalie Heimdal – guest vocals on "She Dragoon", backing vocals on tracks 3, 6 and 7

Production
 Seth Siro Anton – artwork
 Gustavo Sazes – layout, design
 Nils Harald Mæhlum – engineer
 Tore Østby – engineer
 John Anders Narum – engineer
 Leif Johansen – engineer
 Stefan Glaumann – mixing
 Svante Forsbäck – mastering
 Lars Lanhead – photography

Charts

References

2020 albums
Conception (band) albums